In heraldry, purpure, is a tincture, equivalent to the colour "purple", and is one of the five main or most usually used colours (as opposed to metals).  It may be portrayed in engravings by a series of parallel lines at a 45-degree angle running from upper right to lower left from the point of view of an observer, or else indicated by the abbreviation purp.

Purpure has existed since the earliest periods, for example in the purpure lion of the arms of León; at that time, it was painted in a greyer shade. However, it has never been as common as the other colours, and this has led to some controversy as to whether it should be counted among the common colours.  In French heraldry, the colour is usually excluded from the common colours as well as considered "ambiguous" (could be either colour or metal), and Finnish heraldry restricts its use to certain additaments.

There is at least one instance of it being blazoned as "Imperial Purple". One of the most expensive colors to acquire in ancient times, Tyrian purple was used in the war banner of Byzantine Emperor Komnenos: Purpur (porphyr red) a double-headed eagle displayed Or.

Sometimes, the different tinctures are said to be connected with special meanings or virtues, and represent certain elements and precious stones. Even if this is an idea mostly disregarded by serious heraldists throughout the centuries, it may be of anecdotal interest to see what they are, since the information is so often sought after. Many sources give different meanings, but purpure is often said to represent the following:

 Of jewels, the amethyst 
 Of heavenly bodies, Mercury (this is disputable.  Western Alchemy associates the amethyst with Jupiter; viz. 777.)
 The planet Mercury is further associated with the element mercury or "quicksilver" in traditional alchemical/occultistic lore

Gallery

See also
Born in the purple ("Porphyrogennetos")
Tyrian purple
Purple

References

External links

Heraldica.org: Purpure, discussion based on Michel Pastoureau, Traité d'Héraldique.
Red vs. Purple Lions

Colours (heraldry)
Shades of magenta
Shades of violet